The Government e Marketplace (or e-Marketplace) (GeM) is an online platform for public procurement in India. The initiative was launched on August 9, 2016 by the Ministry of Commerce and Industry, Government of India with the objective to create an open and transparent procurement platform for government buyers. It was built in a record time of 5 months to facilitate the online procurement of goods and Services. The purchases through GeM by Government users have been authorized and made mandatory by the Ministry of Finance by adding a new Rule No. 149 in the General Financial Rules, 2017.

The platform is owned by GeM SPV (Special Purpose Vehicle) which is a 100 percent Government-owned, non-profit company under the Ministry of Commerce and Industries, Government of India.

GeM is a contactless, paperless and cashless online marketplace that replaced the Directorate General of Supplies and Disposals (DGS&D) in 2016. Since its inception, GeM has brought in the visibility and transparency in public procurement. The portal has transformed public procurement in India by driving its three pillars, namely, inclusion, usability and transparency and efficiency and cost savings. According to an independent assessment made by the World Bank, average savings for buyers in Government e Marketplace portal is about 9.75% on the median price. The Government of India has made it mandatory for sellers to display the 'country of origin' on products to be sold on GeM portal.

The present Chief Executive Officer of Government e Marketplace is Sh. Prashant Kumar Singh, an IAS officer of the 1993 batch of Manipur cadre.

History 
The Government e-Marketplace was launched in August 2016 to enable central and state governments and CPSEs for online procurement of goods and services. The initial version of GeM portal was developed and hosted by the erstwhile Directorate General of Supplies and Disposals (DGS&D) under the Ministry of Commerce and Industry with technical support of National E-Governance Division (NeGD), Ministry of Electronics and Information Technology. Currently, a Managed Service Provider (MSP)  is responsible for enhancing and maintaining  the GeM portal. For payment services, GeM has linked with numerous banks and the IT systems of significant buyers.

Objective 
GeM's three key pillars — Efficient, Transparent, and Inclusiveness — ensure that business in the Government e Marketplace is quick and easy. It is Inclusive since it allows anyone and everyone to do business on GeM, Efficient for conducting business operations smoothly, and Transparent for fair business practices. In addition, the platform seeks to improve openness, effectiveness, and speed in public procurement. It offers a wide range of procurement methods, including direct purchase, electronic bidding, electronic reverse auction, and direct reverse auction. The digital platform enables economies of scale, efficient price discovery, and dissemination of best practices. According to Rule 149 of the General Financial Rules 2017, the procurement of goods and services by ministries, government agencies, and Public Sector Enterprises is now madated   to be done through the GeM portal.  State Governments are also encouraged to purchase through GeM.

Initiatives 
 The Union Minister of State for Agriculture & Farmer’s Welfare Shri Parshottam Rupala launched the dedicated web page for Bamboo products and quality planting materials on  the GeM portal in June 2021. The page is referred to as ‘The Green Gold Collection’.
 In order to help the proprietors, meet with large-scale orders, GeM launched a Google Playstore App GeM SAHAY in June 2021 that helps the proprietors in getting loans against their purchase orders.
 On the occasion of World Environment Day 2021, a new product category of ‘Green Room Air Conditioners’ was launched on GeM portal. 
 GeM launched a dedicated page for COVID19 products in June 2021 that helped in meeting with emergency requirements of oxygen cylinders, concentrators, kits etc.
 GeM as a mark of inclusivity, its third pillar, opened the portal for onboarding specially abled sellers under its initiative ‘Divyangjan entrepreneurs’ in June 2021.
 The Unified Procurement System for goods and services was launched in October 2020 with the integration of the Central Public Procurement Portal (CPPP) with GeM and the functionalities of the "GeM Availability Report and Past Transaction Summary" and "custom bids".
 In December 2019, GeM launched a two-month-long national outreach program called GeM Samvaad to facilitate the onboarding of sellers while catering to specific requirements and procurement needs of buyers.
 GeM Start-up Runway was launched to facilitate startups in selling innovative products and services to government users in April 2019.
 In February 2019, GeM started an initiative called SWAYATT to promote Startups, Women and Youth Advantage through eTransactions on the Government e Marketplace portal. It was launched by Suresh Prabhu, the Union Minister of Commerce & Industry and Civil Aviation.
 On January 14, 2019, the Union Government launched an initiative called 'Womaniya on Government e Marketplace' that enables women entrepreneurs and Women Self-Help Groups to sell handicrafts, handloom, and accessories directly to Government departments.
 The National Mission on GeM (NMG) was launched on September 5, 2018 by Suresh Prabhu, the Commerce and Industry Minister to accelerate the adoption and use of GeM by major central ministries, states, UTs and their agencies, including CPSUs, PSUs, local bodies.

Financials 
As of February 10, 2023  GeM   INR 3.50 lakh Crores order value & in current Financial Year, GeM has already crossed 1.5 Lakh Crores of order value.

Statistics 
As of February 10, 2023, GeM has 66,663 Buyer Organisations and 58,93,283  Sellers & Service Providers out of which  8,77,528 are MSME Sellers & service providers. Further, it has more than 30,81,000 products in about  11,358 product categories, and it has 278 service categories.

Awards and recognition 
 Chartered Institute for Procurement and Supply (CIPS) has awarded GeM as the winner under the ‘Best use of digital technology’ category at its Excellence in Procurement awards, 2021
 Winner of the Dun & Bradstreet India's Top PSUs Awards, 2021 in the category of "E-Governance Solutions for Public Procurement
 The company won The Hindu Business Line Changemaker Award for Digital Transformation in March 2020.
 The platform was also nominated for the United Nations' ITU WSIS Prize.
 In 2018, it was honoured with Digital India Platinum Award for 'Exemplary Online Service' by the Ministry of Electronics and Information Technology (MeitY).
 Government e-Marketplace was awarded the South Asia Procurement Innovation Award by the World Bank in 2016.

See also 

 Atmanirbhar Bharat
 Digital India

References

External links 
 
 
 
 

2016 establishments in India
Internet properties established in 2016
Government-owned companies of India
Indian companies established in 2016
Retail companies established in 2016
Public sector in India
India government-related lists
Digital India initiatives
Internet in India
Government procurement
Modi administration initiatives